The 1981–82 Divizia B was the 42nd season of the second tier of the Romanian football league system.

The format has been maintained to three series, each of them having 18 teams. At the end of the season the winners of the series promoted to Divizia A and the last four places from each series relegated to Divizia C.

Team changes

To Divizia B
Promoted from Divizia C
 Constructorul Iași
 Relonul Săvinești
 Victoria Tecuci
 Dunărea Călărași
 Automatica București
 Energie Slatina
 Drobeta-Turnu Severin
 Strungul Arad
 Someșul Satu Mare
 Minerul Ilba-Seini
 Carpați Mârșa
 ICIM Brașov

Relegated from Divizia A
 Politehnica Iași
 Baia Mare
 FCM Galați

From Divizia B
Relegated to Divizia C
 Borzești
 ROVA Roșiori
 Metalul Aiud
 Minerul Gura Humorului
 Poiana Câmpina
 Metalurgistul Cugir
 Cimentul Medgidia
 Nitramonia Făgăraș
 Minerul Moldova Nouă
 Chimia Brăila
 Sirena București
 Minerul Anina

Promoted to Divizia A
 FC Constanța
 CS Târgoviște
 UTA Arad

Renamed teams
Oltul Sfântu Gheorghe was renamed as CSM Sfântu Gheorghe.

Rulmentul Alexandria was renamed as Unirea Alexandria.

Other teams
Șoimii Sibiu and IPA Sibiu merged, the second one being absorbed by the first one. After the merge Șoimii Sibiu was renamed as Șoimii IPA Sibiu.

League tables

Serie I

Serie II

Serie III

See also 
 1981–82 Divizia A
 1981–82 Divizia C
 1981–82 County Championship
 1981–82 Cupa României

References

Liga II seasons
Romania
2